Thalictrum clavatum, known by the common name mountain meadow-rue, is a perennial plant in the buttercup family (Ranunculaceae) found in the southeastern United States.

Description
Thalictrum clavatum is a herbaceous plant with alternate, pinnately compound leaves, on hollow, green stems found in moist woods, cliffs, seepage slopes, and mountain streams of the southeast United States. The flowers are white up to 8 mm. diameter, borne in May, June, and July.

References

clavatum
Flora of the Southeastern United States